Boott is a surname. Notable people with the name include:

 Elizabeth Boott (1846–1888), American painter
 Francis Boott (1792–1863), American physician and botanist active in Great Britain
 Francis Boott (composer) (1813–1904), American classical music composer
 Kirk Boott (1790–1837), American industrialist

See also
 Boott Mills, part of an extensive group of cotton mills in Lowell, Massachusetts, US
 Boott Spur, a minor peak located in Coos County, New Hampshire, US
 Boot (surname), including a list of people with the name
 Boot (disambiguation)